Aimee Louise Watkins (born 11 October 1982) is a New Zealand former cricketer who played as an all-rounder.

Career
Watkins appeared in 2 Test matches, 103 One Day Internationals and 36 Twenty20 Internationals for New Zealand between 2002 and 2011. She played domestic cricket for Central Districts, as well as spending seasons with Sussex and Devon.

Born in New Plymouth, Watkins is a left-handed batter and right arm off spin bowler. She was New Zealand's leading wicket-taker at the 2009 Women's Cricket World Cup with 11, including a best performance of 4 for 2 against South Africa.

Watkins along with Suzie Bates holds the record for the highest 2nd wicket partnership in WT20I history (118*)

She became captain of New Zealand following the 2009 World Cup upon the retirement of Haidee Tiffen.

In June 2011, she announced her retirement from international cricket.

One Day International centuries

See also 
 List of centuries in women's One Day International cricket

References

External links

1982 births
Living people
New Zealand women cricketers
New Zealand women Test cricketers
New Zealand women One Day International cricketers
New Zealand women Twenty20 International cricketers
Central Districts Hinds cricketers
Cricketers from New Plymouth
New Zealand women cricket captains
Sussex women cricketers
Devon women cricketers
New Zealand expatriate sportspeople in England